The Unified Nepal National Front (UNNF, established 15 August 2005) is a political organisation whose main objective is the return of the territories of Nepal lost as a result of Sugauli Treaty on 4 March 1816. Secondary priorities include the promotion of Nepalese national unity and security, focused on the concept of 'Greater Nepal'. Its chairman is Phanindra Nepal.

Activities of the UNNF
The UNNF promotes the concept of Greater Nepal. Its chairman, Phanindra Nepal, has on multiple occasions protested about it in India, demanding the return of nearly 58,000 km2 of land to Nepal.

References

External links
Official site

Nepalese irredentism
2005 establishments in Nepal
Political parties established in 2005
Nepalese nationalism
Political parties in Nepal